Western Illinois University is a public university in Macomb, Illinois, US.

WIU may also refer to:

Wadi International University, in Wadi al-Nasara, Syria
Washington International University, an online unaccredited university
Webber International University, in Babson Park, Florida, US
Wiru language (ISO 639-3: wiu)

See also